The year 1680 in science and technology involved some significant events.

Astronomy
 14 November NS – Great Comet of 1680 observed by Gottfried Kirch, the first comet discovered by telescope.

Biology
 English comparative anatomist Edward Tyson publishes Phocæna, or The anatomy of a porpess, dissected at Gresham Colledge, concluding that the porpoise is a mammal.
 Robert Morison publishes Plantarum Historiae Universalis Oxoniensis, Pars Secunda, seu Herbarum Distributio Nova per Tabulas Cognationis et Affinitatis ex Libro Naturae observata et detecta, utilising his method of taxonomy.

Chemistry
 30 September – Robert Boyle reports to the Royal Society of London his manufacture of phosphorus. He uses it to ignite sulfur-tipped wooden splints, forerunners of the match.

Physics
 8 July – Robert Hooke observes the nodal patterns associated with the vibrations of glass plates.

Births

Deaths
 17 February – Jan Swammerdam, Dutch naturalist, founder of both comparative anatomy and entomology (born 1637)
 22 March – François Cureau de La Chambre, French physician (born 1630)
 Marie Meurdrac, French chemist and alchemist (born 1610)

References

 
17th century in science
1680s in science